Kawmoora is a large flat sandbank which is linked to Myanmar through a narrow strip of land that is fortified by a  long border wall. It is completely surrounded by Thailand.

Kawmoora was originally established as a stronghold for the Karen National Union and its armed wing, the Karen National Liberation Army, until it was captured by government forces on 21 February 1995.

External links 
 Rumble in the Jungle - The Battle of Kawmoora
 Battle of Kawmoora footage

References

Shoals of Asia
Battlefields